The Whitaker Ministry was formed in 1882 as the government of New Zealand. It was led by Frederick Whitaker and lasted for 17 months, from 21 April 1882 to 25 September 1883. The Whitaker Ministry succeeded the Hall Ministry upon John Hall's resignation.

Background
John Hall resigned as Premier due to health issues and a Cabinet conflict with Native Minister John Bryce, which led Governor Gordon to attempt to call Sir George Grey to form a Ministry. Hall reminded the Governor that his following held a majority in the House of Representatives and nominated Frederick Whitaker to replace him. Whitaker had been the Hall Government's representative in the Legislative Council, renowned as “a Triton among minnows” in that house. Harry Atkinson represented Whitaker in the lower house.

The Ministry succeeded Hall's retrenching government, but as a Budget surplus had been achieved, they felt able to reduce the property tax by half and raise a 3 million pound loan for Public Works. Atkinson introduced a bill to establish a contributory social security scheme in 1882, but this was well ahead of contemporary opinion, and his second attempt in 1883 was greeted with “ribald laughter”. Similarly, William Rolleston’s attempt to create a perpetual Crown lease option for land ownership was amended beyond recognition by the Legislative Council.

On 15 September 1882 the ministry passed the North Island Main Trunk Railway Loan Act,  to expedite construction of the North Island Main Trunk south of Te Awamutu by authorising the overseas borrowing of a million pounds for the work.

Whitaker had only intended to serve for a single session of Parliament, and having found the Premiership tiresome, he returned to his legal practice. He was succeeded by his close colleague Harry Atkinson.

Ministers
The following members served in the Whitaker Ministry:

References

See also
 Government of New Zealand

Ministries of Queen Victoria
Governments of New Zealand
1882 establishments in New Zealand
1883 disestablishments in New Zealand
Whitaker Ministry
Whitaker Ministry